NGC 4065 is an elliptical galaxy located 300 million light-years away in the constellation Coma Berenices. The galaxy was discovered by astronomer William Herschel on April 27, 1785. It was then rediscovered by John Herschel on April 29, 1832 and was listed as NGC 4057. NGC 4065 is the brightest member of the NGC 4065 Group. 

NGC 4065 is a companion of NGC 4061.  The two galaxies form an interacting pair, as evidenced by distortions in their optical isophotes. 

It is classified as a radio galaxy.

See also
 List of NGC objects (4001–5000)

References

External links

4065
038156
07050
Coma Berenices
Astronomical objects discovered in 1785
Elliptical galaxies
Radio galaxies
NGC 4065 Group
Interacting galaxies
Discoveries by William Herschel